Thaddeus Spencer Jr. (March 28, 1943 – December 13, 2013) was an American heavyweight boxer.

A native of Portland, Oregon, Spencer made his professional boxing debut in May 1960. After building up a 31-5 record, which included wins over contenders Doug Jones, Brian London and Amos Lincoln, he was highly regarded enough to be a part of the eight-man WBA elimination tournament, held after Muhammad Ali had been stripped of the title. Spencer won a 12 round decision over former title-holder Ernie Terrell in August 1967 and was then matched against Jerry Quarry in the semi-finals. Despite entering the bout as a 6/4 favourite, Spencer lost to Quarry by a 12th round TKO. Spencer lost his next three fights by knockout, to Leotis Martin, Billy Walker and Mac Foster, and was never a serious title contender again. He continued boxing until 1971, though without winning another bout.

Spencer died in his sleep on December 13, 2013 in Vallejo, California. Spencer's son, Todd Spencer, was a football star for U.S.C., and played 3 seasons in the N.F.L. for the Steelers and the Chargers.

Professional boxing record

References

External links
 

1943 births
2013 deaths
Boxers from Portland, Oregon
Heavyweight boxers
American male boxers